Venugopalpuram is a village and Gram panchayat of Nalgonda mandal, Nalgonda district, in Telangana state.

References

Villages in Nalgonda district